Kul Sorkh-e Lirasad (also Romanized as Kūl Sorkh-e Līrāsad) is a village in Mahur Berenji Rural District, Sardasht District, Dezful County, Khuzestan Province, Iran. At the 2006 census, its population was 39, in 4 families.

References 

Populated places in Dezful County